English place names in Canada is a list of Canadian place names which are named after places in England, carried over by English emigrants and explorers.

Alberta

Amesbury
Bentley
Bingley
Bircham
Boscombe
Bowden
Brocket
Calthorpe
Chailey
Chigwell
Carnwood
Didsbury
Dovercourt
Drayton Valley
Dunstable
Edmonton
Egremont
Erith
Fairview (hamlet)
Fairview (town)
Fleet
Gainford
Grantham
Hinton
Hythe
Inglewood, Calgary
Inglewood, Edmonton
Keswick
Redcliff
Styal
Taplow
Torrington
Vauxhall
Wembley
Willingdon
Wimborne
Woking
Wrentham
Yeoford

British Columbia

Abbotsford
Ashcroft
Barnet
Barnston
Boston Bar
Brentwood
Colwood
Crofton
Cumberland
Derby
Enderby
Fort Nelson
Grantham
Jesmond
Kimberley
Langdale
Langford
Langley
Lytton
Nelson
New Brighton
New Denver
New Westminster
Rayleigh
Revelstoke
Revelstoke Lake
Richmond
Rosedale
Royston
Silverdale
Surrey
New Westminster
Victoria

Manitoba

Carberry
Ipswich
Kenton
Matlock
Morden
Oxford House
Petersfield
Reston
Seven Sisters
Somerset
St. Clements

New Brunswick

Andover
Bath
Beresford
Bristol
Canterbury
Carleton County
Gloucester County
Hampton
Hanwell
Hartland
Hillsborough
Kent County
Keswick Ridge
Lancaster
Northampton Parish
Northumberland County
Norton
Salisbury
Sheffield
Southampton
Sunbury County
Sussex
Sussex Corner
Westmorland County
Wickham
Woodstock
York County

Newfoundland and Labrador

Appleton
Barton
Brighton
Bristol's Hope
Churchill Falls
Dover
English Harbour
Epworth
Riverhead
Southport
Whitbourne
Windsor

Nova Scotia

Aldershot
Alton
Aylesford
Barrington
Bedford
Berwick
Bramber
Bridgetown
Brighton
Cambridge
Canning
Chelsea
Chester
Colchester County
Cumberland County
Dartmouth
Digby
Dover
East Dover
West Dover
Enfield
Halifax
Hants County
Hantsport
Kingston
Liverpool
Manchester
Martock
Milton
Oldham
Osborne Harbour
Oxford
Plymouth, Pictou County
Plymouth, Yarmouth County
Richmond County
Seaforth
Sherwood
South End
Southampton
Stonehouse
Tiverton
Truro
West Dover
Weston
Weymouth
Windsor
Yarmouth
Yarmouth County

Nunavut

Baker Lake
Baillie-Hamilton Island
Bathurst Inlet
Bathurst Island
Borden Island
Brock Island
Buckingham Island
Cambridge Bay
Chesterfield Inlet
Dundas Harbour
Southampton Island

Ontario

Abingdon
Acton
Acton Corners
Addington
Aldershot
Alton
Alnwick Township
Amberley
Ancaster
Ashton
Ajax
Bancroft
Bath
Battersea
Belton
Berkeley
Berwick
Blackburn
Bolton
Boston
Bradford
Brampton
Brighton
Burford
Burlington
Cambridge
Carlisle
Cavan
Chatham-Kent
Chelmsford
Chelsey
Clifford
Colchester
Collingwood
Cornwall
Croydon
Cumberland
Dartford
Don Valley
Dorchester
Dorking 
Dorset
Dublin
Dundalk
Dundas
Durham
Essex
Essex County
Exeter
Felton
Flamboro
Grimsby
Gloucester
Guelph
Halton Hills
Hamilton
Hampton
Harrow
Hastings
Hastings
Hull
Healey Falls
Hawkesbury
Ilderton
Inglewood
Islington (Etobicoke)
Keswick
Kingston
Kitchener
Lambeth, Middlesex County, Ontario
Lambeth, Oxford County, Ontario
Lancaster
Latchford
Leamington
Leeds
Leitrim
Limehouse
Lincoln
London
Maidstone
Malton
Manchester
Mansfield
Markham
Middlesex County
Milton
Navan
Newark
Newcastle
New Liskeard
Newmarket
Norham
Northumberland County
Norwich
Oxford County
Parham, Ontario, Frontenac County
Pelham
Peterborough
Peterborough County
Pickering
Poplar
Port Dover
Portsmouth
Preston
Richmond
Richmond Hill
Romney Township
Rosedale
Salford
Saltford
Scarborough
Seaforth
Sheffield
Shrewsbury
Southampton
Southwold
Stratford
Sudbury
Sunbury
Sunderland
Sutton
Tamworth
Tilbury
Tiverton
Tottenham
Uxbridge
Wainfleet
Walford
Walton
Warkworth
Warwick
Watford
Wellington
Wellington North
Westminster, Middlesex County
Westminster, Prescott and Russell United Counties
Whitby
Whitchurch
Wicklow
Winchester
Windsor
Woodstock
Wooler
York
York County

Prince Edward Island
Cornwall
Kensington

Quebec

Acton Vale
Beaconsfield
Bedford
Blackpool
Brigham
Buckingham
Bury
Cantley
Chichester
Chelsea
Compton
Farnham
Frampton
Godmanchester
Hampstead
Huntingdon
Hull
New Carlisle
New Richmond
Rawdon
Richmond
Ripon
Saint-Honoré-de-Shenley
Shrewsbury
Upton
Wakefield
Warwick
Weedon

Saskatchewan

Aylesbury
Cudworth
Cumberland House
Eston
Hanley
Maidstone
Penzance
Spalding
Torquay
Weldon
White City

See also

Canada
English name
English